The English College, Dubai is an independent school in Dubai following the British curriculum from FS1 to Year 13. It is located in the Al Safa 1 residential area, adjacent to Sheikh Zayed Road, opposite Oasis Mall. The English College prides itself on its multicultural student base and has 730 students from a variety of nationalities. The premises is purpose-built and houses a swimming pool, sports hall, two libraries, football field, basketball court, art studio and a Sixth Form common room. The English College is going through an extensive rebuilding and refurbishment programme - classrooms are being added, music rooms, art studios, science laboratories, Sixth Form centre, dining facilities and food technology area. A purpose-built sports complex will house a multi-purpose sports hall, dance studio, fitness suite and tiered seating.

History
The English College, Dubai is an independent school which was opened in 1992, owing to a need to establish more quality secondary schools following the British curriculum in Dubai. In January 2019, the English College merged with Manor Primary School and became an all-through school: Primary school (FS1 to Year 5), Middle school (Year 6 to Year 8) and Secondary school (Year 9 to Year 13).

School rating
The latest report by the independent Dubai Schools Inspection Bureau awarded the school a status of Good.

The Knowledge and Human Development Authority (KHDA) is an educational quality assurance authority based in Dubai which undertakes early learning, school and higher learning institution management and inspections for which it then publishes comprehensive reports. KHDA has awarded The English College, Dubai a ranking of "Good" in terms of overall performance for the last 9 consecutive years with very good and outstanding features ..."

Fee structure
The fee structure for the 2019-2020 academic year is:
 FS1 – FS2: AED 33,500
 Year 1 to 4: AED 43,500
 Year 5 to 6: AED 51,000
 Year 7 to 9: AED 51,556
 Year 10 and 11: AED 55,931
 Year 12 and 13: AED 61,765

(1 GBP = 4.73 AED as of September 2019)

Extracurricular activities
Extracurricular activities participated in by The English College, Dubai include the Duke of Edinburgh's Award and TEDx program

General Certificate of Secondary Education (GCSE) courses

 Arabic - Edexcel
 Art and design Edexcel
 Business Studies - Edexcel
 Computer Science - Edexcel
 Drama - Edexcel
 Economics - AQA
 English Language - AQA
 English Literature - AQA
 French - AQA
 Further Maths - AQA
 Geography - Edexcel
 History - Edexcel
 Information and Communication Technology - Edexcel
 Mathematics - Edexcel
 Moral Studies - UAE
 Music - Edexcel
 Physical Education - Edexcel
 Science (Double Award) - Edexcel
 Spanish- AQA

A-Level courses

 Arabic
 Art and Design
 Biology
 Business Studies
 Chemistry
 Computer Science
 Drama
 Economics
 English
 French
 Geography
 History
 Mathematics
 Further mathematics
 Music
 Physics
 Physical Education
 Psychology
 Sociology
 Spanish
 Law

BTEC courses
  Business
  Travel and Tourism

References

External links

 The English College, Dubai website
 Edexcel website
 AQA website

International schools in the United Arab Emirates
Educational institutions established in 1992
Schools in Dubai
1992 establishments in the United Arab Emirates